Jennic Limited was a privately held UK-based fabless semiconductor company founded in 1996. The company developed microcontrollers that integrated radios with low-power wireless standards support; particularly 802.15.4, 6LoWPAN and Zigbee. It also supplied wired communications products, e.g. ATM and RapidIO cores.

History
Founded by CEO Jim Lindop, Jennic's main investors included UK billionaire Eddie Healey. In addition to its headquarters in Sheffield, UK, the company had offices in China, Japan, Taiwan, and the US. Customers included IBM, Texas Instruments, Johnson Controls and Honeywell.

Originally focused on IP licensing and design services, Jennic repositioned to focus on fabless semiconductor design in 2004. Jennic also received funding from the Department of Trade and Industry in 2005.

In July 2010, Jennic was acquired by Netherlands-based NXP Semiconductors for $12.2 million, plus an additional $7.8 million in consideration if certain performance targets were met. Approximately 50 UK-based Jennic employees transferred to NXP, and the organization  operated as the NXP Low Power RF product line based in Sheffield, England for a time, but in 2020, NXP decided to close the site in Sheffield.

Technology
Products developed by Jennic included JenNet, a wireless networking stack based on the IEEE 802.15.4 standard. JenNet-IP included a 6LoWPAN protocol stack. Jennic was the first chipset manufacturer to support this protocol for their 802.15.4 products. In May 2011, NXP announced its intent to release JenNet-IP network layer software under an open source license.

References

External links
 Official site
 NXP Semiconductors

Fabless semiconductor companies
Companies established in 1996
Electronics companies of the United Kingdom
1996 establishments in England